On 1 July 2022, Chinese Communist Party (CCP) general secretary and Chinese president Xi Jinping visited Hong Kong during the 25th anniversary of its handover to the People's Republic of China. The visit was Xi's second visit to Hong Kong during his leadership, the first visit after the passage of the national security law that dramatically increased government crackdown on dissent and Xi's first trip outside mainland China since the start of the COVID-19 pandemic.

During the visit, he inaugurated John Lee as chief executive of Hong Kong.

References 

Xi Jinping
Xi Jinping visits